Yu Baosi is a fictional character in Water Margin, one of the Four Great Classical Novels of Chinese literature. Nicknamed "God of the Dangerous Road", he ranks 105th among the 108 Stars of Destiny and 69th among the 72 Earthly Fiends.

Background
Yu Baosi is nicknamed "God of the Dangerous Road" because of his huge girth and awesome height of about 10 feet, or more than 3 meters. Leading a bandit gang of about 200 men, he robs travellers on roads in Qingzhou (in present-day Shandong).

Joining Liangshan
Duan Jingzhu steals a rare swift steed called "Jade Lion" at the northern frontier of the Song Empire, which he intends to present to Song Jiang, then second-in-command of the bandit stronghold of Liangshan Marsh. But while on his way, the horse is seized by the Zeng Family Fortress, which also verbally insults Liangshan. Mad over the humiliation, Chao Gai, the chief of Liangshan, personally leads a military attack on the fortress. But he is shot dead by Shi Wengong, the martial arts instructor of the fortress.

After some distractions, Liangshan decides to avenge Chao Gai‘s death. Song Jiang's determination is further strengthened after Yu Baosi seized more than 200 horses his men have purchased and were driving back to Liangshan, and took them to present to the Zengs.

This time the Zengs find the Liangshan force that comes to its gate hard to beat. After losing two of his sons and fearing the fortress would fall, Zeng Nong, the patriarch of the Zeng family, sues for peace. Song Jiang sets the conditions that Yu Baosi as well as the "Jade Lion" and the other horses of Liangshan be handed over. Zeng Nong could meet all the demands except turning over the “Jade Lion", which is possessed by Shi Wengong. Yu Baosi is sent over to the Liangshan camp as hostage in exchange for five chieftains from the Liangshan side. Wu Yong coaxes Yu to surrender, warning him that the Zengs are on their last leg. He also instructs him to dupe the Zengs to come out of the fortress to raid the Liangshan camp. Lastly he is to liaise with the Liangshan hostages, who would create havoc inside the fortress in coordination with the exterior attack. 

Yu returns to lie to the Zengs that Song Jiang is in panic as government troops are arriving to lend them assistance. He suggests this is the time to attack the Liangshan force. The Zengs take the bait. Their leaders are killed in the ambush while the fortress falls. Shi Wengoang is captured by Lu Junyi some distance away as he flees. The outlaws slaughter him in their revenge for Chao.

When Song Jiang leads a military force toward Dongping Prefecture (東平府; present-day Dongping County, Shandong) to seize its grain stock, Yu Baosi volunteers to go ahead first to persuade the prefect and Dong Ping, the place's military commander and an old pal of his, not to resist. Wang Dingliu goes along with him. However, Dong Ping disregards his acquaintance with Yu and suggests executing the two to strike fear among the outlaws. Not wanting to overly provoke Liangshan, the prefect only has them beaten and thrown out. Liangshan captures Dongping and wins over Dong Ping.

Campaigns and death
Yu Baosi is appointed as the chief flag bearer of Liangshan because of his striking height after the 108 Stars of Destiny came together in what is called the Grand Assembly. He participates in the campaigns against the Liao invaders and rebel forces in Song territory following amnesty from Emperor Huizong for Liangshan.

In the battle of Qingxi County (清溪縣; present-day Chun'an County, Zhejiang) in the campaign against Fang La, Yu Baosi is slain by Du Wei, an enemy general.

References

 
 
 
 
 
 
 

72 Earthly Fiends
Fictional characters from Shandong